Jabalpur Lok Sabha constituency is one of the 29 Lok Sabha constituencies in Madhya Pradesh state in central India. This constituency covers the entire Jabalpur district.

Assembly Segments
Presently, since the delimitation of the parliamentary and legislative assembly constituencies in 2008, Jabalpur Lok Sabha constituency comprises the following eight Vidhan Sabha (Legislative Assembly) segments:

Members of Parliament

^ by poll

Elections Results

General Elections 2019

General Elections 2014

General Elections 2009

See also
 Jabalpur district
 List of Constituencies of the Lok Sabha

References
Election Commission of India
https://web.archive.org/web/20081218010942/http://www.eci.gov.in/StatisticalReports/ElectionStatistics.asp

Notes

Lok Sabha constituencies in Madhya Pradesh
Jabalpur district